Oberea pigra is a species of beetle in the family Cerambycidae. It was described by Newman in 1851. It is known from Australia.

References

Beetles described in 1851
pigra